Touchen End, formerly written Touchen-end, is a village in the civil parish of Bray in the English county of Berkshire.

History
The earliest record of a settlement is from 1274 when it was called Twychene however by 1360 it was registered as a tithing called Iwhurst. A man called John de Iwhurst first moved to the area in 1293 and his family remained until at least 1540. By 1607 Twychene was part of Fines Bailiwick, an area of Windsor Forest owned by the Manor of Feens and Woolley. An ancient road from Touchen End to the Manor at Maidenhead Thicket can be identified running through Paley Street, Heywoods Manor and Breadcroft Lane.

Toponymy
The settlement's earliest name, Twychene, is possibly a corruption of 'two chain' where chains were stretched across road junctions to enable a toll to be levied. As the village lies on the junction of the A330 and the B3024 this is a plausible explanation. Another theory is that the Touchen End has evolved from a shortening of Tutchin Lane End meaning a hamlet at the fork of a road, twicen(e) being Old English for fork of a road. In the years since 1274 the village has been recorded on maps and referred to in documents which show the evolution of the name:

Holy Trinity Church 

The village expanded in the mid-19th century with the building of an Anglican church, Holy Trinity, and an adjoining National School. The church was built in 1862 in the 14th-century style and is constructed of red brick with stone dressings and a tiled roof, the architect was John Turner. The stained glass windows "of a simple grisaille pattern" and fittings were designed by William White. Within five years the church was so overcrowded that a south aisle was built, paid for by public subscription including a donation from Queen Victoria. 

In later years, it served as a chapel of ease to St Michael's, Bray until it was deconsecrated in the early 1970s. It is now, along with the school buildings, a private residence. The south aisle was demolished at the time of conversion and the east window, given by David Blackmore, is now in a prison chapel at Long Crendon, Buckinghamshire. The graveyard attached to Holy Trinity remains in use by the parish of Bray and is notable for the grave of William Thomas Forshaw VC.

References

External links 
William Thomas Forshaw VC
Holy Trinity on Church Plans Online

Villages in Berkshire
Bray, Berkshire